The Republican Liberal Party (PLR) was a political party in Portugal.

History
The party was established in 1919 by a merger of the Evolutionist Party and the Republican Union. The new party emerged as the largest in the 1921 elections, winning 79 of the 163 seats in the House of Representatives and 32 of the 71 seats in the Senate. However, it was beaten by the Democratic Party in the 1922 elections.

In 1923 the party merged with the Reconstitution Party and the National Republican Party to form the Nationalist Republican Party.

References

Conservative parties in Portugal
Defunct political parties in Portugal
Political parties established in 1919
Political parties disestablished in 1923
1919 establishments in Portugal
1923 disestablishments in Portugal